The Boudette Peaks are twin peaks,  and  high, located  west-southwest of Lavris Peak in the northern portion of Mount Hartigan, in the Executive Committee Range, Marie Byrd Land. They were mapped by the United States Geological Survey (USGS) from surveys and from U.S. Navy trimetrogon photography, 1958–60, and named by the Advisory Committee on Antarctic Names for Eugene L. Boudette, a USGS geologist who was a member of the Marie Byrd Land Traverse Party, 1959–60.

References 

Mountains of Marie Byrd Land
Executive Committee Range